The Westminster Larger Catechism, along with the Westminster Shorter Catechism, is a central catechism of Calvinists in the English tradition throughout the world.

History 
In 1643 when the Long Parliament of England called the Westminster Assembly to produce the Westminster Confession, it also asked for a directory of "catechising". The Assembly asked Herbert Palmer to produce a draft of the Larger Catechism. Robert Baillie and other Scottish delegates found the work disappointing. In December 1643 a committee was formed to write the Catechism. In January 1647 the Assembly gave up writing one catechism and split it into two. The Westminster Shorter Catechism was to be "easier to read and concise for beginners" and the Larger Catechism was to be "more exact and comprehensive".  The Catechism was completed by the Westminster Assembly in 1647. It was then adopted by the General Assembly of the Church of Scotland in 1648 and (with modifications relating to the civil magistrate) by the Presbyterian Synod of New York and Philadelphia in 1788, and by the Presbyterian Church in the U.S.A., upon its formation the following year. In 1967, it was dropped by the United Presbyterian Church in the U.S.A. in the formulation of their Book of Confessions.  However, it was embraced by the successor denominations such as the Presbyterian Church (U.S.A.) in that church's Book of Confessions as well as the more conservative successors, the Presbyterian Church in America (PCA), the Orthodox Presbyterian Church, the Evangelical Presbyterian Church, and the Bible Presbyterian Church.

See also
 Westminster Shorter Catechism

References 

 Van Dixhorn, Chad Is the Larger Catechism Worthwhile?
 Hetherington, William History of the Westminster Assembly of Divines

External links
 
 Westminster Larger Catechism with Scripture proofs

Westminster Standards
Catechisms
Congregationalism
Presbyterianism
English Reformation
Westminster Assembly
Protestant education
Church of Scotland